Sven van Doorm (born 17 April 1997) is a Dutch professional footballer who plays as a midfielder for Eerste Divisie club FC Eindhoven.

Club career
Born in Epe, Van Doorm joined Vitesse in 2006, following a spell with EZC '84. Ahead of the 2018–19 campaign, he joined Eerste Divisie side, Telstar on a season-long loan following a contract extension. On 24 August 2018, he went onto make his professional debut during Telstar's 1–0 home defeat to MVV, featuring for the entire 90 minutes.

On 22 June 2022, Van Doorm signed a two-year contract with FC Eindhoven, also competing in the Eerste Divisie.

Career statistics

References

1997 births
Living people
Association football midfielders
Dutch footballers
People from Epe, Netherlands
Eerste Divisie players
SBV Vitesse players
SC Telstar players
FC Eindhoven players
Netherlands youth international footballers
Footballers from Gelderland
Derde Divisie players